Celia Margaret Britton, FBA (born 20 March 1946) is a British scholar of French Caribbean literature and thought. She was Carnegie Professor of French at the University of Aberdeen from 1991 to 2002 and Professor of French at University College London from 2003 to 2011. She had previously lectured at King's College London and the University of Reading.

Early life and education
Britton was born on 20 March 1946 to James Nimmo Britton and Jessie Muriel Britton. She studied modern and medieval languages at New Hall, Cambridge, graduating with a Bachelor of Arts (BA) degree in 1969; as per tradition, her BA was later promoted to a Master of Arts (MA Cantab) degree. Remaining at New Hall, she studied for a postgraduate diploma in linguistics which she completed in 1970. She then moved to the University of Essex where she undertook postgraduate research in literary stylistics, and she completed her Doctor of Philosophy (PhD) degree in 1973.

Academic career
From 1972 to 1974, while still studying for her doctorate, Britton was a temporary lecturer in French at King's College London. From 1974 to 1991, she was a lecturer in French studies at the University of Reading. Then, from 1991 to 2002, she was Carnegie Professor of French at the University of Aberdeen. Her final position before retirement was a Professor of French at University College London, which she held between 2003 and 2011. In 2011, she retired from full-time academia and was appointed an emeritus professor.

Britton's research focuses on French Caribbean literature and thought. She has published work on Édouard Glissant, a Martinican writer, Frantz Fanon, a Martinique-born philosopher and writer, and Maryse Condé, a Guadeloupean author. Britton has research interests in postcolonial theory, the Nouveau Roman, and ethnography.

Honours
In 2000, Britton was elected a Fellow of the British Academy (FBA), the United Kingdom's national academy for the humanities and social sciences. In 2003, she was appointed a Chevalier of the Ordre des Palmes Académiques by the French government.

Selected works

References

1946 births
Living people
British literary historians
Academics of University College London
British literary critics
British women literary critics
Fellows of the British Academy
Alumni of New Hall, Cambridge
Alumni of the University of Essex
Academics of King's College London
Academics of the University of Reading
Academics of the University of Aberdeen
Chevaliers of the Ordre des Palmes Académiques